Chanaka Devinda (born 25 June 1997) is a Sri Lankan cricketer. He made his List A debut for Kilinochchi District in the 2016–17 Districts One Day Tournament on 19 March 2017. He made his first-class debut for Saracens Sports Club in the 2017–18 Premier League Tournament on 6 February 2018. He made his Twenty20 debut for Lankan Cricket Club in the 2018–19 SLC Twenty20 Tournament on 16 February 2019.

References

External links
 

1997 births
Living people
Sri Lankan cricketers
Kilinochchi District cricketers
Kalutara Town Club cricketers
Lankan Cricket Club cricketers
Saracens Sports Club cricketers
Place of birth missing (living people)